Ichichali is a rural locality (a selo) in Tsudni-Shabdukhsky Selsoviet, Gumbetovsky District, Republic of Dagestan, Russia. The population was 160 as of 2010. There are 3 streets.

Geography 
Ichichali is located 24 km southwest of Mekhelta (the district's administrative centre) by road. Tsundi and Kizhani are the nearest rural localities.

References 

Rural localities in Gumbetovsky District